Gove is both a surname and a given name. The name is of Scottish origin and is derived from the Gaelic word for "smith" or "metalworker". Notable people with the name include:

Surname 

Anna Maria Gove (1867–1948), American physician
Cyril Gove (1890–1973), Australian Rules footballer
David Gove (1978–2017), American ice hockey player
DiAnne Gove (born 1951), American politician in New Jersey
Jeff Gove (born 1971), American golfer
Jennifer Gove (born 1940), South African cricketer
Jesse Gove (1824–1862), soldier in the American Civil War
Kirstin Gove (born 1973), Scottish TV presenter
Michael Gove (born 1967), British politician
Philip Babcock Gove (1902–1972), editor of Webster's dictionary
Samuel F. Gove (1822–1900), U.S. Representative from Georgia

Given name 

Gove Saulsbury (1815–1881), American politician
Gove Scrivenor, American musician

Footnotes

Surnames of Scottish origin